"Supernatural Horror in Literature" is a 28,000 word essay by American writer H. P. Lovecraft, surveying the development and achievements of horror fiction as the field stood in the 1920s and 30s. The essay was researched and written between November 1925 and May 1927, first published in August 1927, and then revised and expanded during 1933–1934.

The essay
Lovecraft's essay ranges widely, but he first examines the beginnings of weird fiction in the early gothic novel. As a guide for what to read in the early gothic he relied partly on Edith Birkhead's 1921 historical survey The Tale of Terror, and he was also able to draw on the expertise of the great many experts and collectors in his circle. The bulk of the essay was written in New York City giving Lovecraft easy access to the resources of the city's great public libraries and also to the collections of his friends, and thus he was able to read widely and obtain obscure and rare works.  His survey then proceeds to outline the development of the supernatural and the weird in the work of major writers such as Ambrose Bierce, Nathaniel Hawthorne, and Edgar Allan Poe. Lovecraft names as the four "modern masters" of horror: Algernon Blackwood, Lord Dunsany,  M. R. James, and Arthur Machen.  In addition to these masters, Lovecraft attempts to make the essay an encompassing survey, and thus he mentions or notes many others in passing.

Publication history
The text was first published in August 1927 in the one-issue magazine The Recluse, and copies were widely circulated. It was then partly published in revised serial form in The Fantasy Fan in 1933–35.  The full revised text first became easily available to the public in The Outsider and Others (1939).

Critical reception
An H. P. Lovecraft Encyclopedia terms the work "HPL's most significant literary essay and one of the finest historical analyses of horror literature." 
After the first publication the critic Edmund Wilson, who was not an admirer of Lovecraft's fiction, praised the recent essay as a "really able piece of work... he had read comprehensively in this field—he was strong on the Gothic novelists—and writes about it with much intelligence". David G. Hartwell has called "Supernatural Horror in Literature" "the most important essay on horror literature".

References

External links

"Supernatural Horror in Literature"—eText at the H. P. Lovecraft Archive
"A Map on Chalkboards" – An imagemap following the chapters of the essay (containing its entire text)

1927 essays
1927 non-fiction books
American essays
Essays by H. P. Lovecraft
Non-fiction books by H. P. Lovecraft
Essays about literature
Works about horror fiction